Kimami Sitauti (born 12 April 1991) is an Australian rugby union player.

His playing position is right-winger. He is of Tongan heritage.

Move from New Zealand & early career
Sitauti is from Auckland, and he was part of Auckland Under 14s in 2005. He moved to Australia and attended Nudgee College in 2008. He was still in Year 12 at Nudgee, when he was named to play for Souths in the final of the club competition.

Australian sevens and under 20s
In 2010 Sitauti got his first taste of sevens for Australia in Darwin. He travelled to New Zealand for more sevens at the Cake-Tin in Wellington before going to India to compete in  sevens at the 2010 Commonwealth Games.

He was part of the Australian Under 20s at the 2011 IRB Junior World Championships.

Super Rugby
He was part of the Reds squad in 2011 although he did not make any first-team appearances.

References

External links
 Rebels profile

1991 births
Australian rugby union players
Australian sportspeople of Tongan descent
ACT Brumbies players
Queensland Reds players
Melbourne Rebels players
Bay of Plenty rugby union players
Rugby union wings
People from Brisbane
Sportsmen from Queensland
Male rugby sevens players
Living people
Australia international rugby sevens players
Commonwealth Games silver medallists for Australia
Rugby sevens players at the 2010 Commonwealth Games
Commonwealth Games medallists in rugby sevens
Commonwealth Games rugby sevens players of Australia
Australian expatriate rugby union players
Expatriate rugby union players in New Zealand
US Colomiers players
RC Narbonne players
Medallists at the 2010 Commonwealth Games